The Last Classed Blast is a 2006 album by American band Dufus released on October 16.

Track listing
 "Dawn Crusade"
 "Babylon Com"
 "Tutu"
 "Innabarabie"
 "Dissassemblement Hymn" 
 "Exponential"
 "Heaven Is Waiting"
 "Balloon Rocking Chair"
 "War Is Over"
 "Right On"
 "Nenglich Phlarloosely"
 "You Weren’t Ready"
 "Sacred Charney"
 "On and On"
 "Lay Down Flat"
 "Try More Patiently"

References

2006 albums
Dufus (band) albums